Belepole is a residential locality of Howrah, West Bengal, India. It is an urban sprawl which sprung up near the old localities of South Howrah, like Bhattacharjee Para, Chatterjeehat etc. It is located near Shibpur. It has excellent communication and transportation facilities owing to its location, its life line is Kona Expressway which connects it to the Vidyasagar Setu (Second Hooghly Bridge) and hence Kolkata is just  15 minutes away. It is close to the State administrative building Nabanna.

Belepole is under the jurisdiction of Chatterjeehat Police Station of Howrah City Police.

Demographics
The area is mainly inhabited by Hindus who have Bengali as their mother tongue. Hence Bengali is the main language of the area.

Notable locations

 Belepole Panch Mathar More or Belepole Bus Stop.
 Hang Sang Crossing or Belepole Crossing.
 Kusum Kumari Park.
 Dhole Company Warehouse and Factory.
 Howrah Indoor Stadium and Dumurjala Sports City
 Zaika Inn.
 Bayleaf Restaurant.
 Chatterjeehat.

Main occupations

The main occupations of the area are running restaurants and eateries, working in factories and family business, in addition to that a number of doctors, engineers, IT consultants and government workers live in the locality. Many Old residential houses are also there.

Transport
Belepole has grossly a 2 km radius and is interconnected by lanes and bylanes. Dr. Bholanath Chakraborty Sarani (Formerly Drainage Canal Road), Sarat Chatterjee Road and Kona Expressway intersect in the area making transportation excellent, although traffic jams are frequent in the area. Bus and E-rickshaw are the main means of transport of the locals.

Bus

Private Bus
 72 Dumurjala - Park Circus
 K6 Tikiapara railway station - Rajabazar
 K11 Domjur - Rabindra Sadan
 KB15 Santragachi railway station - Anandapur

Mini Bus
 7 Carry Road - Shyambazar
 26 Unsani - Esplanade
 S119/1 Santragachi railway station - B.B.D. Bagh

WBTC Bus
 C11 Domjur - B.B.D. Bagh/Belgachia
 E6 Amta - Esplanade
 E7 Bagnan railway station - Esplanade
 EB1A Santragachi railway station - Belgharia (Rathtala)
 T8 Tikiapara railway station - B.B.D. Bagh/Belgachia
 VS12 Santragachi railway station - New Town Bus Stand
Many Shuttle Buses (Without Numbers) also pass through Belepole crossing.

Train
Padmapukur railway station and Santragachi Junction are the nearest railway stations.

See also

 Kadamtala
 Shibpur
 Santragachi
 Ramrajatala
 Howrah Indoor Stadium

Neighbourhoods in Howrah
Cities and towns in Howrah district
Neighbourhoods in Kolkata
Kolkata Metropolitan Area